Return to Nim's Island is a 2013 Australian adventure-fantasy film directed by Brendan Maher and starring Bindi Irwin, Matthew Lillard, Toby Wallace and John Waters. It premiered on Walden Family Theater film series on the Hallmark Channel.

The story is based on the book Nim at Sea by Wendy Orr. It is the sequel to the 2008 film Nim's Island.

Plot
Three years after the events of Nim's Island, the island faces a new challenge. The operators of the ship Buccaneer have gotten permission to develop a pirate resort on the island, and 14-year-old Nim (Bindi Irwin) and her father pursue separate plans to stop them. Meanwhile, a city boy named Edmund (Toby Wallace), who has met Nim once before and decides to see her again, has run away from home to the island, inadvertently bringing poachers with him. With her father, Jack Rusoe (Matthew Lillard) away on the mainland, Nim must learn to work with Edmund in order to save the island from the poachers.

Cast
 Bindi Irwin as Nim Rusoe
 Toby Wallace as Edmund
 John Waters as Booker
 Matthew Lillard as Jack Rusoe
 Jack Pearson as Ben
 Sebastian Gregory as Frankie
 Nathan Derrick as Felix
 BJ and Friday as Selkie
 Pumpkin as Fred

Production
The film was filmed in Australia. The film was produced by Walden Media and Arc Entertainment in the Walden Family Theater film series on the Hallmark Channel. The film premiered on 15 March 2013, followed by the DVD release at Walmart on 19 March. It was release in movie theatres in Australia on 4 April 2013.

References

External links
 
 

2013 films
2010s adventure films
Films set on fictional islands
Australian sequel films
Australian adventure films
Walden Media films
Television sequel films
Films scored by Nerida Tyson-Chew
Films set in Queensland
Films shot at Village Roadshow Studios
2010s Australian films